Credence High School is a CBSE-affiliated co-educational Indian school in Dubai, United Arab Emirates. It was established in 2014 to provide education to the children of Indian expatriates and is located off Sheikh Zayed Road, in Al Quoz. The school is rated Good by Knowledge and Human Development Authority, the education regulating body of the UAE and hosts students of over thirty nationalities.

Overview 
Credence High School was founded in 2014 by a group of Indian expatriate businessmen, led by Azad Moopen, Nalapad Ahmed Abdulla and Sameer K. Mohamed to provide education mainly to Indian expatriate children. The school follows Central Board of Secondary Education (CBSE) curriculum. The staff strength of the school is 143 who host a student strength of 596, comprising 30 nationalities. Deepika Thapar Singh serves as the principal of the school while it is chaired by Nalapad Ahmed Abdulla, one of the founders.

Location
The school is located off Sheikh Zayed road in Al Quoz, Dubai.

Facilities 
The School complex is housed in a 25,700 square feet building on 2.8 hectares (7 acres) of land. It has a capacity to admit 3000 students and the facilities include a library, laboratories, dance and music hall, purpose-built indoor hall for sports and cultural activities, swimming pool, athletic track, courts for volleyball, basketball and cricket, and a football ground.

Extra-curricular activities 
The school has a Student Council which governs student activities. The student council includes elected students for different sports, literary and cultural activities. It organizes UAE Quiz Masters Tournament, an annual inter-school quiz competition which attracts participants from various other schools in the UAE.

KHDA inspection report
The Knowledge and Human Development Authority (KHDA) has rated the school Good for the year 2017-18 academic year.

See also 

 The Indian High School, Dubai
 Education in Dubai
 List of schools in the United Arab Emirates
 Education in the United Arab Emirates

References

External links
 
 
 

Educational institutions established in 2014
Indian international schools in the United Arab Emirates
International schools in Dubai
Private schools in the United Arab Emirates
2014 establishments in the United Arab Emirates